Jiangsu Normal School may refer to:
Jiangsu Normal University (江苏师范大学)
Suzhou High School, formerly known as Jiangsu Normal School (江苏师范学堂)